Aeranthes henricii is a species of orchid.

henricii
Orchids of Africa